Coe is an unincorporated community in Monroe Township, Pike County, in the U.S. state of Indiana.

History
Coe was originally called Arcadia, and under the latter name was laid out in 1869.

A post office was established at Coe in 1896, and remained in operation until it was discontinued in 1907.

Geography

References

Unincorporated communities in Pike County, Indiana
Unincorporated communities in Indiana